This is a list of minerals, both metallic and non-metallic found in Pakistan province wise.

Mining areas 
Minerals are found richly, in all of the Provinces of Pakistan. They may be mined in common locations or regions based on their popularity. Different minerals may also be mined in different regions such as the Hindu Kush, Himalaya, and Karakorum ranges.

Punjab

Non-metallic minerals

 Brine
 Calcite
 Coal
 Ilmenite
 Kaolin
 Lignite
 Limestone
 marble
 Mica
 Rock phosphate
 Potash
 Pyrite
 Radioactive minerals
 Rock salt
 Silica sand
 Soapstone
 Sulphur
 Vermiculite
 Chromite
 Gypsum

Gemstones

Gemstones, also known as semi-precious stones or gems, are minerals widely used in jewelry and for ornamental purposes. Northern and western regions of Pakistan are rich in high quality gemstones. Some of the major gemstones are enlisted below;
 Peridot
 Aquamarine
 Topaz - in various colours including violet, pink, golden, and champagne
 Ruby
 Emerald
 Bastnaesite - rare earth mineral
 Xenotime - rare earth mineral
 Sphene
 Tourmaline
 Quartz of various types

The main mining areas of these gems are in Khyber Pakhtunkhwa and Federally Administered Tribal Areas, Gilgit-Baltistan, and Balochistan.

See also
 Pakistan Mineral Development Corporation 
Gemstones of Pakistan

References

 Encyclopedia of Pakistan by Zahid Hussain Anjum, Jahangir Book Depot, Pakistan 2005-2006

Minerals of Pakistann
Geology of Pakistan